Brogue is a free roguelike computer video game created by Brian Walker. As in its predecessor Rogue, the goal of Brogue is for the player (represented by the character @) to descend to the 26th floor of the Dungeons of Doom, retrieve the Amulet of Yendor, and return to the surface. Players also have the option of delving deeper into the dungeon to obtain a higher score. This task is complicated by the presence of monsters and traps in a procedurally generated dungeon. 

Development started in 2009, with the latest version, 1.7.5, being released on September 25, 2018. Brogue'''s interface, design and character graphics have been praised for their simplicity and beauty.

Further development of Brogue has taken place under the name Brogue Community Edition or Brogue CE, with multiple contributors. As of February 2023, the latest version of Brogue CE is 1.12.

 Reception IndieGames.coms Cassandra Khaw called Brogue "beautiful and accessible." PC Gamers Graham Smith compared it favorably with The Binding of Isaac, Dungeons of Dredmor and Spelunky; saying "[i]f [...] you want to start swimming to the deeper end of the pool [of roguelikes], Brogue is your waterwings." Rock Paper Shotguns Graham Smith ranked the interface alongside Papers, Please, Democracy 3, and Elite: Dangerous''; citing "using old-fashioned ASCII [...] with a set of effects that make the world colourful and alive."

References

External links

2009 video games
Linux games
MacOS games
Roguelike video games
Video games developed in the United States
Video games using procedural generation
Windows games

Single-player video games